The 1948 French Grand Prix was a Grand Prix motor race, held at Reims on 18 July 1948. The race was won by Jean-Pierre Wimille, driving an Alfa Romeo 158.

Report
Official practice was held in very wet conditions. In spite of this Jean-Pierre Wimille was able to set a time of 2:35.2, not far from the record set in 1939 in dry conditions, nearly 10 seconds faster than Alberto Ascari and nearly 20 seconds faster than the fastest non-Alfa Romeo, Philippe Étancelin's Talbot-Lago. 

As expected, the three Alfa Romeos lead at the start from the Talbot-Lagos. However, Luigi Villoresi's Maserati, which started from near the back of the grid, quickly moved up into third place ahead of Consalvo Sanesi in the third of the Alfas. Villoresi was starting to challenge Ascari for second place when forced to pit for what would be the first of many mechanical issues. This allowed Alfa Romeo to take an easy 1-2-3 win, two laps ahead of the best Talbot-Lago. Although Wimille and Ascari would swap for the lead a few times, mostly as a result of pitstops, they finished in the order decided by team manager Giovanni Guidotti which required Ascari to slow and allow Sanesi to pass him just before the finish.

Classification

References

External links
 1948 Grands Prix results
 StatsF1

French Grand Prix
French Grand Prix
1948 in French motorsport